Kynurenine aminotransferase 3 is an enzyme that in humans is encoded by the KYAT3 gene. It is one of the Kynurenine—oxoglutarate transaminases.

References